Navimag (Naviera Magallanes S.A.) is a ferry operator in Chile.  The company operates two routes carrying passengers and vehicles:
Puerto Montt to Puerto Natales, calling at Puerto Eden (a 4-day journey)
Puerto Montt to Puerto Chacabuco

The company also operates services from Puerto Montt and Puerto Chacabuco to Laguna San Rafael.

The company was formed in 1979, when cargo services between Puerto Montt and Punta Arenas were started.  Passenger services to Puerto Natales and Laguna San Rafael were added in 1985. 

In 2000 the Magallanes joined the fleet second hand. Built in 1977/78 in Japan, she was renamed Evangelistas in 2007. During her two-decades long career with Navimag she spent most of her time on the route to Puerto Natales. After her replacement 2020 by the Esperanza she was scrapped in India. 

The Puerto Edén was used in principal to Chacabuco.

In late 2009 Amadeo 1 joined the fleet  and early 2014 Navimag began operating the Edén along Amadeo 1 as operational Ro-ro ferries to Puerto Natales.

On August 18, 2014 en route to Puerto Natales, Navimag ferry Amadeo 1, struck a rock in the Kirke Channel near Puerto Natales. The collision caused a starboard breach of the hull and the ship took on water. Amadeo 1 capsized in the shallow water, with most of the ship lying above the water line. 

During the following year, Navimag determined that the ship was not salvageable. With the assistance of the Armada de Chile, the Amadeo 1 was scuttled in 2,700-meter-deep waters off Diego de Almagro Island, Chile on September 21, 2015. 

In 2016, Navimag purchased the Trinidad I to join Evangelistas on the Puerto Montt route while Edén took over the service to Chacabuco.

In 2020 the Chinese built Esperanza entered service, replacing Evangelistas. This new passenger-freight ferry will carry up 244 passengers along with vehicles at a maximum speed of 13 knots.

Navimag Ferries

References

External links 

  Navimag's route from Puerto Montt to Puerto Natales through the Chilean fjords in Google Earth

Ferry companies of Chile
Transport in Los Lagos Region
1979 establishments in Chile
Transport in Magallanes Region